The Vogelkop blue-eye (Pseudomugil reticulatus) is a species of fish in the subfamily Pseudomugilinae. It is found in Irian Jaya in New Guinea.

References

Fish of New Guinea
Pseudomugil
Taxa named by Gerald R. Allen 
Fish described in 1986